El Informador is a Venezuelan regional newspaper, headquartered in Barquisimeto, in the state of Lara.

On 15 February 2018, as a result of shortages of paper, the newspaper stopped circulating on Fridays and Saturdays until further notice. Further, on the edition of 19 February 2018 of the newspaper, it reduced its color usage and page count to 16 per day.

See also
 List of newspapers in Venezuela

References

External links
El Informador website

Publications established in 1968
Newspapers published in Venezuela
Spanish-language newspapers
Mass media in Barquisimeto